HDCI (High Definition Camera Interface) used in Polycom video conferencing systems. It uses a 60-Pin Low-force helix high-density connector interface.

Provides input for the main camera and second camera. These inputs support multiple formats in a single connector (Composite, S-Video, or analog Component YPbPr) and RS232 Serial PTZ control, using its own protocol (not Sony VISCA Protocol),

Pinouts

  1  RS232 Rx
  2  RS232 Tx
  3  IR
  4  +12 V DC
  5  +12 V DC
  7  Ground - IR RTN
  8  Ground
 10  +12 V DC
 11  +12 V DC
 12  Pb / B Shield
 13  Pb / B 
 14  Pr / R / C Shield  - CHROMA
 15  Pr / R / C ( pg 70 of Integrators's Reference indicates 15 is Shield and 14 is Chroma for SVideo input )
 16  Left Mic 
 17  Right Mic
 18  ARM Mic
 19  Center Mic
 42  A Ground
 43  A Ground
 44  Right Mic Shield
 45  Left Mic Shield
 46  Y / G / C Shield
 47  Y / G / C   -  LUMA
 48  P Ground
 50  H Sync
 51  V Sync
 52  H / V Shield
 58  P Ground

Cable end size 
Length to base of interface: 56mm

Length to end of plug: 62mm

Width of plug at base of interface: 41.5mm

External links
 HDCI Camera Break-Out Cable
  Integrator’s Reference Manual for Polycom HDX Systems

Image processing
Videotelephony
Analog video connectors